A hunky punk is a grotesque carving on the side of a building, especially Late Gothic churches. Such features are especially numerous in Somerset (in the West Country of England).

Though similar in appearance to a gargoyle, a hunky punk is purely decorative, with no other functional purpose (often referred to as a grotesque). A gargoyle is not strictly a hunky punk, because a gargoyle serves to drain water off the roof through its mouth. An example might be found at the corner of a church tower, along the coping ridge below any castellations. Often there are carvings on each corner, yet the roof may only drain in one direction and so there might be three hunky punks and one true gargoyle.

Hunky punks are often short squatting figures typical of those found in some Somerset churches; however, hunky punks come in many shapes and sizes, mostly in middle to late medieval construction onwards.  Some theories consider that the balance of good and evil in church design was to remind worshippers of the narrow path they tread, which was present in everything. This supposes that, for every good and benign creature (such as a saint or an animal) to signify purity, there had to be an opposite to bring out the fear of evil. In York Minster, for example, the carvings in the chapter house, which are particularly obscene and which were supposedly created as caricatures of the then dean and chapter, were put there above the seats to create an opposite to each occupant, who one might like to assume was not in fact the foul person their carvings made them out to be.

Examples

The church tower of St Mary the Virgin, Isle Abbotts has eight hunky punks around its top. They depict a person playing the bagpipes, a lion-dog (Chinese guardian lion), a goat, a dragon, a Chinese dragon, a primitive dragon, a winged lion and a lion.

See also
 Church grim, a folklore spirit
 Sheela na gig, another architectural grotesque

References

Further reading
Hunky punks: a study in Somerset stonecarving, Peter Poyntz Wright, Avebury Pub. Co., 1982

External links
 Goddess or Queen? The enigmatic carving at Braunston in Rutland
 Hunky Punks: a blurb about a book about Somerset stone carvings
 Short video about conservation of a hunky punks

Arts in Somerset
English legendary creatures
Grotesques
History of Somerset
Somerset folklore
Squatting position